A voodoo doll, sometimes known as a Louisiana Voodoo doll, is a supposedly magical object associated with some forms of voodoo and folk magic. 

Voodoo doll may also refer to:

Film and TV
 Voodoo Dolls, a 1990 film starring Anik Matern

Games and sports
 Voodoo Doll, a playable character in Pirates of the Caribbean: Dead Man's Chest (video game)
 New Orleans Voodoo Dolls, a team in the Women's American Football League

Music
 "Voodoo Doll", a song by 5 Seconds of Summer, released in 2014
 "Voodoo Doll", a song by 12 Stones from Picture Perfect
 "Voodoo Doll", a song by Amelia, released in 1962
 "Voodoo Doll", a song by The Bamboos (funk band), released in 2004
 "Voodoo Doll", a song by Crazy Horse Saloon, released in 1972
 "Voodoo Doll", a song by Fergie from The Dutchess
 "Voodoo Doll", a song by Heart from Desire Walks On
 "Voodoo Doll", a song by Ray Johnson (singer), released in 1959
 "Voodoo Doll", a song by Soul Asylum from Say What You Will, Clarence... Karl Sold the Truck
 "Voodoo Doll", a song by VIXX from Voodoo (VIXX album)
 "Voodoo Doll", a song by Wild Cherry (band), released in 1975